Frederick Hale or Fred Hale may refer to:
 Frederick Harding Hale (1844–1912), member of Canadian Parliament
 Frederick Albert Hale (1855–1934), American architect
 Frederick Marten Hale (1864–1931), British explosives engineer and inventor
 Frederick Hale (U.S. senator) (1874–1963), U.S. senator from Maine
 Fred Hale (1890–2004), American supercentenarian, 8th oldest man ever
 Fred Hale (footballer) (born 1979), Solomon Islands footballer

See also
 Frederic Hale Parkhurst (1864–1921), 52nd Governor of Maine